Events in the year 1974 in Brazil.

Establishments 
 Construction of the Basilica of the Eternal Father, Trindade was completed.

Incumbents

Federal government
 President: General Emílio Garrastazu Médici (until 14 March), General Ernesto Geisel (starting 15 March)
 Vice President: General Augusto Rademaker (until 14 March), General Adalberto Pereira dos Santos (starting 15 March)

Governors 
 Acre: vacant
 Alagoas: Afrânio Lages
 Amazonas: João Walter de Andrade
 Bahia: Antônio Carlos Magalhães 
 Ceará: César Cals 
 Espírito Santo: Artur Carlos Gerhardt Santos 
 Goiás: Leonino Caiado 
 Guanabara: Antonio de Pádua Chagas Freitas
 Maranhão: Pedro Neiva de Santana 
 Mato Grosso: José Fragelli 
 Minas Gerais: Rondon Pacheco 
 Pará: Fernando Guilhon 
 Paraíba: Ernâni Sátiro 
 Paraná: Emílio Hoffmann Gomes 
 Pernambuco: Eraldo Gueiros 
 Piauí: Alberto Silva
 Rio de Janeiro: Raimundo Padhila then Floriano P. Faria Lima
 Rio Grande do Norte: Jose Pereira de Araújo Cortez 
 Rio Grande do Sul: Euclides Triches 
 Santa Catarina: Colombo Salles 
 São Paulo: Laudo Natel 
 Sergipe: Paulo Barreto de Menezes

Vice governors
 Acre: Alberto Barbosa da Costa 
 Alagoas: José de Medeiros Tavares 
 Amazonas: Deoclides de Carvalho Leal 
 Bahia: Menandro Minahim 
 Ceará: Francisco Humberto Bezerra
 Espírito Santo: Henrique Pretti 
 Goiás: Ursulino Tavares Leão 
 Maranhão: Alexandre Sá Colares Moreira 
 Mato Grosso: José Monteiro de Figueiredo 
 Minas Gerais: Celso Porfírio de Araújo Machado 
 Pará: Newton Burlamaqui Barreira 
 Paraíba: Clóvis Bezerra Cavalcanti 
 Paraná: Jaime Canet Júnior 
 Pernambuco: José Antônio Barreto Guimarães 
 Piauí: Sebastião Rocha Leal 
 Rio de Janeiro: Teotônio Araújo
 Rio Grande do Norte: Tertius Rebelo 
 Rio Grande do Sul: Edmar Fetter 
 Santa Catarina: Atílio Francisco Xavier Fontana 
 São Paulo: Antonio José Rodrigues Filho  
 Sergipe: Adalberto Moura

Events 
1 February – A fire at the Joelma Building in São Paulo kills 177 people and injures 293; 11 die later of their injuries.
31 May – Former Portuguese Prime Minister Marcelo Caetano is granted political asylum by President Ernesto Geisel in Brazil, where he has fled following Portugal's Carnation Revolution, which ended 41 years of the Estado Novo dictatorship.

Deaths 
 16 July – Oduvaldo Vianna Filho, playwright (b. 1936)

References

See also 
1974 in Brazilian football
1974 in Brazilian television

 
1970s in Brazil
Years of the 20th century in Brazil
Brazil
Brazil